Tsunematsu (written 恒松) is a Japanese surname. Notable people with the surname include:

, Japanese voice actress
, Japanese footballer

Japanese-language surnames